Goa is a rural locality (a selo) in Burshagsky Selsoviet, Agulsky District, Republic of Dagestan, Russia. The population was 475 as of 2010.

Geography 
Goa is located 11 km southeast of Tpig (the district's administrative centre) by road. Duldug is the nearest rural locality.

References 

Rural localities in Agulsky District